Vinod Kovoor is an Indian actor best known for his work in Malayalam cinema. He gained attention in the comedy show Marimayam, broadcast by Mazhavil Manorama, which conveys a satirical picture of public offices in Kerala. He is also known for his role as "Moosakka" in M80 Moosa, a serial on Media one channel. He has written books on his favorite realm, mimicry and mono-act. His first book Ekabhinaya Samaharam has 25 scripts, and most of it deals with social issues and his second book Kalolsavam Monoact was also released. He got Best actor Award for the short film Athe Karanathal from the National Film Festival. He was best actor for four years consecutively in Kerala Kalolsavam. He won best Excellency award by Rotary, J.C.I. He also received Best Television Anchor Award by K.C.L, Best Comedy artist Award by Kerala Hasyavedi, Kazhcha Award and Best child artist award for the drama Chandrolsavam in Kambissery Nadakolsavam. His Achayan role in the short film "Nerariyathe" was critically acclaimed.

Personal life
He started a mimicry troupe known as Tom & Jerry. He participated in reality shows in AmritaTV and SuryaTV which paved his way to the film field. He debuted with the movie Mazhanool Kanavu in 2003.

He also works as personal trainer and Motivator for students. Currently he resides at Kovoor, Kozhikode with his family.

Filmography

Television series

References

External links
 Official Website
 

Living people
Male actors from Kerala
Male actors in Malayalam cinema
Indian male film actors
Year of birth missing (living people)
People from Kozhikode district
21st-century Indian male actors
Indian male television actors
Male actors in Malayalam television